Ian Richard McDonald (25 June 1946 – 9 February 2022) was an English multi-instrumentalist, best known as a founding member of the progressive rock band King Crimson in 1968, as well as the hard rock band Foreigner in 1976.

McDonald began his music career as an army musician, where he learned the clarinet and taught himself music theory. He also taught himself to play flute, saxophone, guitar and piano. He co-founded King Crimson and appeared on their 1969 debut album In the Court of the Crimson King, playing Mellotron, keyboards and woodwinds. In the mid-1970s, he moved to New York City where he co-founded Foreigner, appearing on the group's first three albums. He later collaborated with Steve Hackett and played in the King Crimson spin-off group 21st Century Schizoid Band. He was also a session musician, predominantly as a saxophonist.

Biography

Early life and army 
McDonald was born on 25 June 1946 in Osterley, Middlesex, the son of Ada (née May) and Keith McDonald, an architect. He grew up in a musical family, regularly listening to records, and taught himself the guitar. His music interests ranged from classical orchestra to dance bands to rock. He was educated at Emanuel School, in Battersea, southwest London. At 15, he left school and began a five-year stint in the British Army as a bandsman. In 1963 he enrolled at the Royal Military School of Music at Kneller Hall, where he took clarinet and learned to read music. He later learned piano, flute and saxophone and taught himself music theory. His experience of playing with army bands gave him great musical adaptability as he had to learn many different musical styles such as show tunes, classical, jazz, and military marches. It was this that honed his style to what eventually became the beginnings of the Prog Rock movement.

King Crimson 
After leaving the army, McDonald moved back to London, and began making music with his girlfriend, former Fairport Convention singer Judy Dyble. The pair were introduced to Robert Fripp and Michael Giles which led to the formation of King Crimson. However, the relationship ended and she left the band before they played their first gig in 1969.

Three months after their first gig, they supported the Rolling Stones at a free concert in Hyde Park. They stole the show, with The Guardian reporting that the Stones' performance was "indifferent", but that King Crimson were "sensational". McDonald's saxophone solo was a high point on their track "21st Century Schizoid Man", and he went on to play this on their first album In the Court of the Crimson King. He also played harpsichord, piano, organ, clarinet, zither, flute, and Mellotron, which he used extensively on the album. This album jump started the prog rock era, and paved the way for similar bands such as Yes and Genesis.

McDonald and drummer Giles left the band due to growing friction. They formed a duo that released one album titled McDonald and Giles, which featured an orchestral backing instead of a Mellotron as used with King Crimson. He reappeared with King Crimson in 1974, playing on the album Red, and intended to rejoin the band as a full member but did not get the opportunity to do so as Fripp dissolved the band.

In 1997, the release of the King Crimson four-CD set Epitaph, consisting of rare live recordings of the 1969 version of King Crimson, renewed interest in the early Crimson material. Out of that interest, the 21st Century Schizoid Band was formed in 2002 and several tours and live albums have followed. The band included former King Crimson members Michael Giles (drums and percussion), Peter Giles (bass), McDonald (sax, flute, keyboards), Mel Collins (alto/tenor sax, flute, keyboards) and also Jakko Jakszyk, who later joined King Crimson, on guitar and lead vocals. After the first tour, Michael Giles was replaced with another former King Crimson drummer Ian Wallace.

Foreigner 
McDonald moved to New York City in the mid-1970s. He became a founding member of the band Foreigner in 1976, for whom he played guitar as well as his woodwinds and keyboards. Although Foreigner was a more conventional rock band compared to King Crimson, McDonald still made significant contributions to the group's arrangement and production. He recorded three multi-platinum albums that made Foreigner a huge success. However, he left the group following their third album, Head Games, after disagreements with group leader Mick Jones.

Other work 
McDonald was also a session musician and played on T. Rex's hit "Bang a Gong (Get It On)", where he borrowed Mel Collins' baritone saxophone. He also appeared on Centipede's album Septober Energy. He produced the Darryl Way's Wolf album Canis Lupus (1973) and Fruupp's Modern Masquerades (1975). The closing track on Canis Lupus, "McDonald's Lament", was dedicated to him. In 1999, he released a solo album, Drivers Eyes, which featured John Wetton, Lou Gramm, John Waite and Gary Brooker.

In 1996, McDonald toured with former Genesis guitarist Steve Hackett, which was included on the album The Tokyo Tapes. The group included a performance of King Crimson's "The Court of the Crimson King".

McDonald contributed saxophone and flute to several tracks on Judy Dyble's 2009 release Talking With Strangers. The album saw McDonald reunited with Fripp on the 20-minute "Harpsong".

In 2017, McDonald and singer-guitarist Ted Zurkowski formed the band Honey West, which released an album Bad Old World in 2017.

Death 
McDonald died from colon cancer at his home in New York City on 9 February 2022, at the age of 75. A trailer for a King Crimson documentary was released a week before his death, in which McDonald apologised to Fripp for leaving the band in 1969.

Selected discography

Giles, Giles & Fripp 
 The Brondesbury Tapes (2001) - Recorded between 1967 and 1968. It features Ian McDonald and Judy Dyble.

King Crimson 
 In the Court of the Crimson King (1969)
 In the Wake of Poseidon (1970, co-composer)
 Red (1974, guest)
 Epitaph (1997, recorded 1969)

Foreigner 
 Foreigner (1977)
 Double Vision (1978)
 Head Games (1979)

Steve Hackett 
 Genesis Revisited (1997)
 The Tokyo Tapes (1998)

Honey West 
 Bad Old World (2017)

Solo 
 McDonald and Giles (1970); with Michael Giles
 Drivers Eyes (1999)

References

Citations

General sources 

 

 Gramy Records – Ian McDonald

External links 
 Ian McDonald on allmusic.com
 
 
 Every Day Is Father's Day For Rock Icon Ian McDonald
 Dad Who Literally Rock: Ian And Maxwell McDonald Share The Stage
 Dmitry M. Epstein – Interview With Ian McDonald, 2017 
 Chuck Darrow Radio Interview With Ian McDonald, 23 May 2017
 Legends Land In Honey West
 Ian McDonald Dementia Honey West Exclusive
 The Ian McDonald Interview (2012)
 Interview with Ian McDonald in Big Bang Magazine
 The Artist Shop IRC Chat with Ian McDonald on Wednesday, 27 October 1999
 The Artist Shop/Talk City chat with King Crimson founding member Ian McDonald on Sunday, 3 May 1998

1946 births
2022 deaths
20th-century British Army personnel
20th-century English male musicians
20th-century saxophonists
21st Century Schizoid Band members
21st-century English male musicians
21st-century saxophonists
British Army soldiers
British male saxophonists
British military musicians
Centipede (band) members
Deaths from cancer in New York (state)
Deaths from colorectal cancer
English expatriates in the United States
English multi-instrumentalists
English rock saxophonists
English session musicians
Foreigner (band) members
King Crimson members
People from Chiswick
People from Osterley
Progressive rock keyboardists
Spooky Tooth members